48 Armoured Regiment is an armoured regiment of the Indian Army.

History
The regiment was raised on 1 December 1982 under the command of Lieutenant Colonel DS Dhadwal at Meerut. It has an all-India, all-class composition, drawing troops from various castes and religions. Lieutenant General Alok Singh Kler, PVSM, VSM is the current Colonel of the Regiment. Men from the regiment have participated in counter insurgency operations through tenures in the Rashtriya Rifles.

Gallantry awards
The regiment has won the following gallantry awards - 
COAS Commendation Cards – 2

Equipment
The Regiment is presently equipped with the T-90 tanks.

Regimental insignia
The Regimental insignia consists of crossed lances with pennons of the regimental colours, mounted with the trident, with the numeral "48" inscribed on the crossing of the lances and a scroll at the base with the Regimental Motto in Devanagari script. The Regimental motto is सम्मान या बलिदान (Samaan Ya Balidaan), which translates to "Death before dishonour". The shoulder title consists of the numeral "48" in brass.

References

Armoured and cavalry regiments of the Indian Army from 1947
Military units and formations established in 1982